Ali Bendebka  (born 13 September 1976, in Kouba) is an Algerian football midfielder. He currently plays for MSP Batna in the Algerian league.

Bendebka spent much of his career with NA Hussein Dey in the Algerian Championnat National. He also has made five appearances for the Algeria national football team.

National team statistics

References

External links

1976 births
Living people
Algerian footballers
Association football midfielders
JS Kabylie players
Footballers from Algiers
Algeria international footballers
Algeria under-23 international footballers
NA Hussein Dey players
MSP Batna players
US Biskra players
MO Béjaïa players
21st-century Algerian people